Myshelovka (Mousetrap) is the third studio album by Soviet/Russian punk band Grazhdanskaya Oborona. The album was released in 1987 and was recorded only by Yegor Letov in Omsk. It was the first album from the 1987 album series (with Khorosho!!, Totalitarizm, Nekrofiliya and Krasny albom).

Background 
Letov was released from the mental ward in March 1986 and immediately began to write and record music. In 1987 he played a set with his friends from Pik Klakson band Evgeny and Oleg Lischenko under the name Adolf Hitler.  When Letov returned home, he found out the authorities were going to put him to a mental ward again. Then Letov took an attempt to record all his songs on tape for three months (from May to July).

He recorded new album on his own, and while he credited other musicians, his collaborators went under pseudonyms as Letov, because the original members of GrOb were forced to sign sworn statements saying that they would stay away from Letov. Myshelovka was recorded with minimal technology in Letov's apartment or the apartments of friends, that his apartment came to be known as GrOb Studio, or GrOb Records. Music verged toward lo-fi, noisy punk rock, occasionally drawing inspiration from Russian reggae and folk tunes. Lyrical themes on the album include anti-communist and suicide moods.

Track listing

Personnel

Grazhdanskaya Oborona 
 Yegor Letov – vocals, guitars, bass guitar, drums, production

Technical
 Konstantin Ryabinov (Kuzya UO) – photography, album design, remastering
 Anna Volkova – photography
 Andrey Kudryavtsev – photography
 Yegor Letov – art design, album design, remastering

References

External links 
 Myshelovka at Discogs (list of versions)
 Album on official site

1987 albums
Grazhdanskaya Oborona albums
Russian-language albums